Group G of the 2023 Africa Cup of Nations qualification tournament is one of the twelve groups that will decide the two of the 24 teams that shall qualify for the 2023 Africa Cup of Nations. It consists of four teams: Mali, Congo, Gambia and South Sudan.

The teams shall play against each other in a home-and-away round-robin format, between 4 June 2022 and March 2023.

Standings

Matches

Goalscorers

References

Group G